The 2018 NFL Draft was the 83rd annual meeting of National Football League (NFL) franchises to select newly eligible players for the 2018 NFL season. The draft was held on April 26–28 at AT&T Stadium in Arlington, Texas; it was the first draft to take place in an NFL stadium and the first to be held in Texas. In order to be eligible to enter the draft, players must be at least three years removed from high school. The deadline for underclassmen to declare for the draft was January 15, 2018.

Five quarterbacks were selected in the first round — Baker Mayfield, Sam Darnold, Josh Allen, Josh Rosen, and Lamar Jackson — the second highest number of first-round quarterback selections (along with the 1999 and 2021 drafts) after the six selected in 1983. However, this QB class is more notable for its lack of success, much like the 1999 class. Of the 5 QBs, only Lamar Jackson and Josh Allen remained with the team that drafted them by 2022. The draft was also the first to have siblings — safety Terrell Edmunds and linebacker Tremaine Edmunds — selected in its first round.

The 2018 NFL Draft was the first of two professional sports drafts to be held in the Dallas–Fort Worth metroplex during the calendar year, as the Dallas Stars hosted the 2018 NHL Entry Draft in June.

Early entrants

In order to be eligible to enter the draft, players must be at least three years removed from high school. The deadline for underclassmen to declare for the draft was January 15, 2018.

The following is the breakdown of the 256 players selected by position:

 39 Linebackers
 33 Wide receivers
 29 Cornerbacks 
 23 Defensive ends
 20 Running backs
 20 Defensive tackles
 21 Offensive tackles
 18 Safeties
 14 Tight ends
 13 Quarterbacks
 9 Offensive guards
 8 Centers
 4 Punters
 2 Placekickers
 2 Fullbacks
 1 Long snapper

Player selections

Notable undrafted players

Supplemental draft 
A supplemental draft was held on July 11, 2018. For each player selected in the supplemental draft, the team forfeits its pick in that round in the draft of the following season.

Trades 

In the explanations below, (PD) indicates trades completed prior to the start of the draft (i.e. Pre-Draft), while (D) denotes trades that took place during the 2018 draft.

Round one

Round two

Round three

Round four

Round five

Round six

Round seven

Media coverage 
Coverage of the draft was broadcast by ESPN and NFL Network, with Fox also simulcasting NFL Network's coverage of the first two rounds of broadcast television (serving as a prelude for Fox's acquisition of Thursday Night Football for the 2018 season). ESPN aired coverage of the last four rounds on ABC. College GameDay broadcast a special edition from outside AT&T Stadium as a pre-show on ESPN, and its panel hosted a secondary broadcast of the first round on ESPN2. ESPN Deportes broadcast coverage in Spanish.

Telecasts of the first round across all three broadcasters (which included the expansion of coverage to broadcast television) drew a combined Nielsen overnight household rating of 8.4, and total viewership of 11.214 million, making it the most-watched opening round since 2014. ESPN drew the largest single audience, with 5.336 million viewers, while Fox and NFL Network had a combined viewership of 5.74 million across both channels (3.776 and 2.005 million individually).

Summary

Selections by college athletic conference

Schools with multiple draft selections

Selections by position

Notes

References 
Trade references

General references

National Football League Draft
NFL Draft
Draft
21st century in Arlington, Texas
National Football League in the Dallas–Fort Worth metroplex
NFL Draft
Events in Arlington, Texas
Sports in Arlington, Texas